Sticta atroandensis is a species of foliose lichen in the family Peltigeraceae. It is found in the Colombian Andes.

Taxonomy

The lichen was formally described as a new species in by lichenologists Bibiana Moncada and Robert Lücking. The species epithet refers to its similarity to Sticta andensis, but with some notable differences. Specifically, S. atroandensis is distinguished from Sticta andensis by its dark lower  and smooth apothecial margins.

In a time-calibrated chronogram of the phylogeny of the genus Sticta, Sticta atroandensis was most closely related to S. ambavillaria and a clade containing S. atlantica, S. arachnofuliginosa, and S. pseudohumboldtii.

Description

The true marginal  are absent, but projections of the lower  resembling cilia are usually present. Cyphellae are abundant, rounded, and brown-black. The  is orange-red to red-brown and the margin is cream-colored to beige. The  is up to 105 μm high and the ascospores are hyaline, and have 1–3 septa.

Rhizines are absent, and vegetative propagules are absent as well. The medulla is compact and white. The medulla is 40–150 μm thick and lacks crystals. The lower cortex is paraplectenchymatous and is 20–35 μm thick. The lower primary tomentum is composed of fascicles (bundles) formed of 12–20 hyphae, while the lower secondary tomentum is composed of simple, septate hyphae with their tips free. The cavity of the cyphellae is 40–220 μm high, and the cells of the basal membrane lack .

Habitat and distibution

Sticta atroandensis seems to have a limited distribution in the Colombian Andes, specifically in the páramo and superparamo life zones. Sticta atroandensis typically grows epiphytically in semi-exposed to exposed microhabitats and is frequently found in association with liverworts from the genus Metzgeria and the family Lejeuneaceae.

References

atroandensis
Lichen species
Lichens described in 2013
Lichens of Colombia
Taxa named by Robert Lücking